Quitman High School is a public high school located in the city of Quitman, Texas.  It is a part of the Quitman Independent School District located in central Wood County.

Academics

Enrollment 
 the school had an enrollment of 294 students and 31.08 classroom teachers , for a student–teacher ratio of 9.46. There were 119 students eligible for free lunch and 24 eligible for reduced-cost lunch. The student population at Quitman is predominantly White, with a large Hispanic and Latino Americans.

 the school was rated Met Standard by the Texas Education Agency.

Awards 

 the school was recognized for Academic Achievement in English Language Arts (ELA)/Reading by the Texas Education Agency.

Programs

Advanced Placement (AP)
Quitman offers Advanced Placement courses, which are provided by the Texas Virtual School Network.

Career and Technical Education (CTE)
In addition to the standard curriculum, the school also offers career and technical education (CTE) programs in the following fields.
Agriculture
Business Education
Education and Training
Finance
Family and Consumer Sciences
Health Science
Industrial Technologies

Extracurricular activities

Athletics

 the school offered varsity and junior varsity sports teams for boys and girls, with an additional ninth grade girls volleyball team. These sports are run under the direction of Athletic Director Bryan Oakes and include baseball, basketball, cross country, football, golf, powerlifting, softball, tennis, track and volleyball.

Football games are played at Bud Moody Stadium. Basketball and volleyball games are played at the Delbert Ballard Gymnasium.

State titles
Boys Golf
2010 (UIL Class AA)

State finalist
Boys Basketball
1945 (UIL Class A)
Volleyball
1988 (UIL Class AA)
2005 (UIL Class AA)

Notable alumni
Sissy Spacek – Class of 1967, actress and singer.

References

External links

Public high schools in Texas
Schools in Wood County, Texas